Booker T. Washington High School is a secondary school currently located at 6000 College Parkway in Pensacola, Florida, and is part of the Escambia County School District. It was named after the African-American education pioneer Booker T. Washington. The previous location for the school is now in use as the J.E. Hall Center.

Booker T. Washington is also the primary location for disabled students in the county.

History
The school first opened in 1916 as a segregated black school and remained that way until 1969, when it was integrated as a result of a federal court order. It moved from its previous location on Texar Drive in 1982 to College Parkway.

Notable alumni

Derrick Brooks, NFL linebacker
Ladarius Green, former NFL tight end 
Daniel James Jr., aka Daniel "Chappie" James Jr., first African American four-star general in the United States Armed Forces
Roy Jones Jr., former world champion boxer 
Alex Leatherwood, NFL offensive tackle
Jerry Pate, pro golfer and golf course designer

See also
 List of things named after Booker T. Washington

References

External links

Booker T. Washington High School website
Escambia School District

Escambia County School District
High schools in Escambia County, Florida
Public high schools in Florida
1912 establishments in Florida
Educational institutions established in 1912
Historically segregated African-American schools in Florida